Bon Bini: Judeska in da House is a 2020 Dutch comedy film produced by Maarten Swart and directed by Jonathan Herman. It stars Jandino Asporaat, as the character Judeska from the films Bon Bini Holland and Bon Bini Holland 2. Jandino originally wanted to make Bon Bini Holland 3 but after the COVID-19 pandemic happened, he instead decided to make a lower budget spin-off film in which one of his characters is forced to go into lockdown. The film premiered in Dutch theaters nationwide on December 10, 2020. It was the first Dutch film, after movie theatres reopened, to receive the Golden Film recognition for more than 100,000 visitors.

The film finished in 10th place in the list of best visited films in the Netherlands in 2021 with just over 279,000 visitors.

References

External links 
 

2020 films
2020s Dutch-language films
2020 comedy films
Dutch comedy films